D.B.M.S. English School is an Englishmedium private coeducational day school run by Dakshin Bharat Mahila Samaj (the term translates to: South Indian Women's Society) in the city of Jamshedpur, India.

The school's motto is Jyotirmaye Jyotirdehi meaning Dispel the darkness of ignorance by spreading the light of knowledge.

The school is affiliated with the Council for the Indian School Certificate Examinations (I.C.S.E) in New Delhi that conducts exams at the 10th and 12th grade levels. Students specialize in Arts, Science and Commerce at the 12th grade level. It has grades from kindergarten to 12th (Plus Two), with two kindergarten levels. At the end of the 10th standard, every student sits for the I.C.S.E Examination. The I.S.C Examination is taken by all students after Class XII.

Subjects taught include English, Mathematics, Physics, Chemistry, Biology, Biotechnology, Computer Science, Environmental Science, Accountancy, Economics, Commerce, Civics and Geography.

Management
The school was started in 1965 by Dakshin Bharat Mahila Samaj (D.B.M.S.), an association of ladies from South India. The Samaj was founded in 1944 with the motto: Vasudeva Kutumbakam – the world is a family. The Samaj manages D.B.M.S. English School and its sister institutions. The other institutions under it are:
 D.B.M.S. Girls H.S. School; founded in 1961
 D.B.M.S. Career Academy; started in 1992
 Binapani School for tribal education at Ghorabhanda, beyond Telco; started in 2001
 D.B.M.S. Kadma Girls School; a Tata Steel school whose management was taken over in 2003
 D.B.M.S. Liliput School; started in 2004
 Adult Education; started in 2006

Principals
 Mr Reynold C D'Souza, 1972–1986
 Mrs Lathika Das, 1986–2000
 Mrs Prema Balasubramanian, 2000–2004
 Mr N. P. Shastry, 2004–2006
 Mrs Rajani Shekhar, 2006– Present

Notable alumni
 Indian cine star R. Madhavan
 Imtiaz Ali Famous Director acclaimed for directing films like Socha Na Tha, Rockstar, Highway, Jab We Met and others.
 Miss India Universe 2004 and Bollywood actress Tanushree Dutta
 Ishita Dutta, Bollywood Actress, sister of Tanushree Dutta
 Simone Singh, actor (Heena)
 Ishank Jaggi, Indian cricketer playing from Jharkhand Cricket Team 
 Virat Singh, Cricketer

External links
 Council for the Indian School Certificate Examinations
 QUANTA Quizbowl Competition

Private schools in Jharkhand
Education in Jamshedpur
Educational institutions established in 1965
1965 establishments in Bihar